Titanium(III) fluoride (TiF3) is an inorganic compound with the formula TiF3.  It is a violet solid.  It adopts a perovskite-like structure such that each Ti center has octahedral coordination geometry and each fluoride ligand is doubly bridging.

References

Fluorides
Titanium(III) compounds
Titanium halides